The 45th New York State Legislature, consisting of the New York State Senate and the New York State Assembly, met from January 2 to April 17, 1822, during the fifth year of DeWitt Clinton's governorship, in Albany.

Background
Under the provisions of the New York Constitution of 1777, amended by the Constitutional Convention of 1801, 32 Senators were elected on general tickets in the four senatorial districts for four-year terms. They were divided into four classes, and every year eight Senate seats came up for election. Assemblymen were elected countywide on general tickets to a one-year term, the whole Assembly being renewed annually.

In 1797, Albany was declared the State capital, and all subsequent Legislatures have been meeting there ever since. In 1818, the Legislature enacted that future Legislatures meet on the first Tuesday of January of each year unless called earlier by the governor.

State Senator Gideon Granger resigned in 1821, leaving a vacancy in the Western District.

On March 13, 1821, the 44th New York State Legislature passed a bill to submit the question, whether a Constitutional Convention should be called, to the voters at the next State election in April 1821.

In 1821, Erie County was split from Niagara County, but remained with Cattaraugus, Chautauqua and Niagara in one Assembly district. Livingston and Monroe counties were formed from parts of Genesee and Ontario counties, and were apportioned one seat each in the Assembly, taken from Ontario.

At this time the politicians were divided into two opposing political parties: the Federalists and the Democratic-Republicans. The Democratic-Republican Party was split into two factions: the Clintonians (supporters of Gov. DeWitt Clinton) and the Bucktails (led by Martin Van Buren, and including the Tammany Hall organization in New York City). The Federalist Party was disbanding, the majority joined the Clintonians, a minority joined the Bucktails.

Elections
The State election was held from April 24 to 26, 1821. Abel Huntington (Southern D.), Abraham J. Hasbrouck (Middle D.), David C. Judson, Daniel Shipherd, John L. Viele (all three Eastern D.), Henry Seymour ( Western D.); and Assemblymen Abraham Gurnee (Southern D.), Archibald McIntyre (Middle D.) and Samuel M. Hopkins (Western D.) were also elected to the Senate. Huntington, Gurnee and Seymour were Bucktails, the other six Clintonians.

At the same time, the question whether a Convention to amend the New York Constitution should be called, was answered in the affirmative by the voters, and delegates to the Constitutional Convention of 1821 were elected in June.

Sessions
The Constitutional Convention met from August 28 to November 10, 1821, and the new Constitution was adopted by the voters in January 1822.

The Legislature met at the Old State Capitol in Albany on January 1, 1822, and adjourned on April 17.

Samuel B. Romaine (Buckt.) was elected Speaker with 74 votes against 44 for George Huntington (Clint.). Edward Livingston (Buckt.) was elected Clerk of the Assembly with the same vote against Sandford Cobb (Clint.).

On April 12, the Legislature re-apportioned the Assembly districts. All multiple-county districts (except Hamilton and Montgomery) were dismembered, and every county became a district. The total number of assemblymen was increased from 126 to 128.

On April 17, the Legislature enacted that future State elections be held on the first Monday in November and the two succeeding days.

State Senate

Districts
The Southern District (6 seats) consisted of Dutchess, Kings, New York, Putnam, Queens, Richmond, Rockland, Suffolk and Westchester counties.
The Middle District (9 seats) consisted of Albany, Chenango, Columbia, Delaware, Greene, Orange, Otsego, Schoharie, Sullivan and Ulster counties.
The Eastern District (8 seats) consisted of Clinton, Essex, Franklin, Hamilton, Herkimer, Jefferson, Lewis, Montgomery, Rensselaer,  St. Lawrence, Saratoga, Schenectady, Warren and Washington counties.
The Western District (9 seats) consisted of Allegany, Broome, Cattaraugus, Cayuga, Chautauqua, Cortland, Erie, Genesee, Livingston, Madison, Monroe, Niagara, Oneida, Onondaga, Ontario, Oswego, Seneca, Steuben, Tioga and Tompkins counties.

Note: There are now 62 counties in the State of New York. The counties which are not mentioned in this list had not yet been established, or sufficiently organized, the area being included in one or more of the abovementioned counties.

Members
The asterisk (*) denotes members of the previous Legislature who continued in office as members of this Legislature. Abraham Gurnee, Archibald McIntyre and Samuel M. Hopkins changed from the Assembly to the Senate.

Under the provisions of the new Constitution, all senators were legislated out of office at the end of 1822. The whole Senate was renewed at the State election in November 1822, the term of the new senators beginning on January 1, 1823.

Employees
Clerk: John F. Bacon

State Assembly

Districts

Albany County (4 seats)
Allegany and Steuben counties (2 seats)
Broome County (1 seat)
Cattaraugus, Chautauqua, Erie and Niagara counties (2 seats)
Cayuga County (3 seats)
Chenango County (3 seats)
Clinton and Franklin counties (1 seat)
Columbia County (4 seats)
Cortland County (1 seat)
Delaware County (2 seats)
Dutchess County (5 seats)
Essex County (1 seat)
Genesee County (3 seats)
Greene County (2 seats)
Hamilton and Montgomery counties (5 seats)
Herkimer County (3 seats)
Jefferson County (2 seats)
Kings County (1 seat)
Lewis County (1 seat)
Livingston County (1 seat)
Madison County (3 seats)
Monroe County (1 seat)
The City and County of New York (11 seats)
Oneida and Oswego counties (5 seats)
Onondaga County (4 seats)
Ontario County (5 seats)
Orange County (4 seats)
Otsego County (5 seats)
Putnam County (1 seat)
Queens County (3 seats)
Rensselaer County (5 seats)
Richmond County (1 seat)
Rockland County (1 seat)
St. Lawrence County (1 seat)
Saratoga County (4 seats)
Schenectady County (2 seats)
Schoharie County (3 seats)
Seneca County (2 seats)
Suffolk County (3 seats)
Sullivan and Ulster counties (4 seats)
Tioga County (1 seat)
Tompkins County (2 seats)
Warren and Washington counties (5 seats)
Westchester County (3 seats)

Note: There are now 62 counties in the State of New York. The counties which are not mentioned in this list had not yet been established, or sufficiently organized, the area being included in one or more of the abovementioned counties.

Assemblymen
The asterisk (*) denotes members of the previous Legislature who continued as members of this Legislature.

Employees
Clerk: Edward Livingston
Sergeant-at-Arms: Henry Fryer
Doorkeeper: James Myers
Assistant Doorkeeper: William Campbell

Notes

Sources
The New York Civil List compiled by Franklin Benjamin Hough (Weed, Parsons and Co., 1858) [see pg. 108f for Senate districts; pg. 124 for senators; pg. 148f for Assembly districts; pg. 198f for assemblymen; pg. 56ff for Constitutional convention]
The History of Political Parties in the State of New-York, from the Ratification of the Federal Constitution to 1840 by Jabez D. Hammond (4th ed., Vol. 1, H. & E. Phinney, Cooperstown, 1846; page 571)
The History of Political Parties in the State of New-York, from the Ratification of the Federal Constitution to 1840 by Jabez D. Hammond (4th ed., Vol. 2, Phinney & Co., Buffalo, 1850; pg. 85 to 97)
Election result Assembly, Albany Co. at project "A New Nation Votes", compiled by Phil Lampi, hosted by Tufts University Digital Library
steuben.1821 Election result Assembly, Allegany and Steuben Co. at project "A New Nation Votes"
Election result Assembly, Broome Co. at project "A New Nation Votes"
Election result Assembly, Cattaraugus, Chautauqua, Erie and Niagara Co. at project "A New Nation Votes"
Partial election result Assembly, Clinton and Franklin Co. at project "A New Nation Votes" [gives only votes from Clinton Co.]
Election result Assembly, Essex Co. at project "A New Nation Votes"
Election result Assembly, Greene Co. at project "A New Nation Votes"
Election result Assembly, Jefferson Co. at project "A New Nation Votes"
Election result Assembly, Kings Co. at project "A New Nation Votes"
Election result Assembly, Monroe Co. at project "A New Nation Votes"
Election result Assembly, Queens Co. at project "A New Nation Votes"
Election result Assembly, Schenectady Co. at project "A New Nation Votes"
Election result Assembly, Schoharie Co. at project "A New Nation Votes"
Election result Assembly, Westchester Co. at project "A New Nation Votes"
Partial election result Senate, Southern D. at project "A New Nation Votes" [gives only votes from Kings, Queens and Westchester Co.]
Partial election result Senate, Middle D. at project "A New Nation Votes" [gives only votes of Albany and Greene Co.]
Partial election result Senate, Eastern D. at project "A New Nation Votes" [gives only votes from Clinton, Essex and Jefferson Co.]
Partial election result Senate, Western D. at project "A New Nation Votes" [gives only votes of Broome, Monroe and Steuben Co.]
Election result Speaker at project "A New Nation Votes"
Election result Assembly Clerk at project "A New Nation Votes"
Election result Council of Appointment at project "A New Nation Votes"

045
1821 in New York (state)
1822 in New York (state)
1821 U.S. legislative sessions
1822 U.S. legislative sessions